The Embassy of Azerbaijan in Washington, D.C. is the diplomatic mission of the Republic of Azerbaijan to the United States.  It is located on Embassy Row at 2741 34th Street, NW, NW Washington, DC.  
The embassy opened on March 6, 1992, after the dissolution of Soviet Union in late December 1991. The United States opened the U.S. Embassy in Baku, Azerbaijan on March 16, 1992. 

The chancery is housed in a 1949 building, with a current estimated value of $3,417,500. It was purchased by the Azerbaijani government on March 22, 2000, for $1,595,000. The building is in the District of Columbia Public School District.

Ambassadors 
 Hafiz Pashayev (November 1992 – November 2006)
 Yashar Aliyev (November 2006 – October 26, 2011)
 Elin Suleymanov (October 26, 2011 – 2021)
 Khazar Ibrahim (September 15, 2021 – present)

See also 
 Diplomatic missions of Azerbaijan
 Azerbaijan–United States relations
 Azerbaijani American
 Foreign relations of Azerbaijan

References

External links 
 

Azerbaijan–United States relations
Buildings and structures completed in 1949
Azerbaijan
United States
1992 establishments in Washington, D.C.